Jurica is a Croatian given name. Notable people with the name include:

Jurica Buljat (born 1986), Croatian football defender, currently playing for Maccabi Haifa
Jurica Golemac (born 1977), Slovenian professional basketball player
Jurica Grabušić (born 1983), Croatian athlete who specializes in the 110 metre hurdles
Jurica Jerković (born 1950), former Croatian footballer
Jurica Pađen, (born 1955), Croatian singer and guitarist
Jurica Pavičić (born 1965), Croatian writer and journalist
Jurica Pavlic (born 1989), Croatian speedway rider
Jurica Puljiz (born 1979), Croatian football defender
Jurica Siljanoski (born 1973), ethnic Macedonian professional footballer
Jurica Vranješ (born 1980), Croatian football midfielder
Jurica Vučko (born 1976), Croatian football striker

See also 
Neven Jurica (born 1952), Croatian politician; Jurica is here the surname
Jura
Juraj

Croatian masculine given names